Bykovka is a rural locality (a selo) and the administrative center of Bykovskoye Rural Settlement, Yakovlevsky District, Belgorod Oblast, Russia. The population was 963 as of 2010. There are 13 streets.

Geography 
Bykovka is located 6 km northwest of Stroitel (the district's administrative centre) by road. Kondarevo is the nearest rural locality.

References 

Rural localities in Yakovlevsky District, Belgorod Oblast
Belgorodsky Uyezd